is a 1989 anime original video animation following the exploits of courier-for-hire Bean Bandit and his partner, gunwoman Rally Vincent.

A manga was also published in the Japanese magazine  that was left unfinished (due to the closure of the magazine) after its fourth chapter. The manga is included in the final volume of the Revised Edition of the Gunsmith Cats manga.

Plot
The anime follows one day in the life of Bean Bandit and Rally Vincent, as they find that they have been framed for the kidnapping of Chelsea Grimwood, the daughter of Mr. Grimwood, President of the Grimwood Company/Grimwood Conglomerate. However, it is Semmerling, by way of various disguises, tricks, and manipulations, who is the real kidnapper — and the real target is Mr. Grimwood himself.

While the police are in hot pursuit of Bean and Rally, along with Chelsea in tow, Semmerling and her helper Carrie plan to make a secret getaway with Mr. Grimwood as hostage.

Cast

Production
Only one episode of Riding Bean was produced and the planned series was never made, due, it is said, to a falling out between writer Kenichi Sonoda and Toshiba EMI.

Sonoda then went on to create the manga comic series Gunsmith Cats. In this series Rally Vincent was the star, but she was now dark-haired (as opposed to blond in the anime), of Asian Indian descent and a bounty hunter. Bean Bandit was a regular character, again as a freelance mob driver. Sonoda stated that the character was a "guy I can identify with much more personally" as compared to the female heroines. He and Rally were not partners, and in fact their relationship varied from ally to enemy depending on the circumstances. Rally's signature car in Gunsmith Cats was the 1967 Shelby Mustang GT500 used by Percy in the anime.

Percy himself appeared in the series Gunsmith Cats Burst, depicted as being in obsessive pursuit of Bean Bandit, with his aim being not to arrest but to actually kill the rogue driver.

Goldie Musou, a character psychologically similar to Semmerling (albeit drawn as a taller woman with a more butch demeanor), also appeared in Gunsmith Cats as a powerful Mafia queen and Rally Vincent's nemesis.

Media
AnimEigo originally released the Riding Bean OVA on VHS in 1990 in Japanese with English subtitles. It was also one of their first releases along with Metal Skin Panic MADOX-01. AnimEigo later produced an English dub of the OVA in 1993, and was released to VHS and Laserdisc early that year. AnimEigo also released the OVA on DVD on March 26, 2002 in a single disc release with Japanese and English language tracks and English subtitles. Bandai Visual released the OVA on Blu-ray on November 21, 2008 in Japan. The principal characters also made cameo appearances in the super-deformed ARTMIC special titled Scramble Wars.

A CD soundtrack was released by Artmic records featuring BGMs (background music tracks) and vocal tracks from the OVA. Songs included "Runnin' the Road," "King of the Road," and "Road Buster" by Phil Perry and "Bad Girl" by Andrea Robinson.

Robert Woodhead, founder of AnimEigo, ran a Kickstarter campaign that ended on April 5, 2016, and raised in excess of US$130,000 (the initial goal was US$30,000) for the 2017 limited-edition Blu-ray release called a "High Octane Edition". They used the same uncompressed HD transfer as the Japanese BD release, but using a BD50 instead of BD25 for a higher bitrate. It contains both the original Japanese soundtrack and the English dub, plus English subtitles in multicolor, greyscale and SDH variants. The disc are not region-coded.

References

External links
 

1980s action thriller films
1989 anime OVAs
Action anime and manga
Anime International Company
1980s chase films
Animated films about automobiles
Films set in the United States
Films set in Chicago
Gunsmith Cats
Japanese action thriller films
Japanese adult animated films
Adult animated comedy films
1980s Japanese films